State Route 364 (SR 364) is a north–south state route in Ohio. It starts from SR 705 near Yorkshire. The route moves north across several counties, then northeast against the side of the Grand Lake. SR 364 then travels west along a concurrency with SR 703, and ends at SR 29 near St. Marys. The route was designated in 1934, from SR 219 to SR 29. It was extended southwards to SR 705 in 1936 and completely paved by 1940. SR 364 was also extended in 1973 to the new alignment of SR 29.

Route description

The route travels through portions of Darke, Mercer, and Auglaize Counties. SR 364 starts at SR 705, on the Darke–Shelby county line. The route goes north in a straight line, through  of Mercer County, and continues onto the Auglaize–Shelby county line. SR 364 continues into Auglaize County, where it passes by the St. Joseph Catholic Church, a historic site. The highway intersects SR 119 in Minister and SR 274 in New Bremen. Later, SR 364 intersects SR 219, and travels northeast, adjacent to the eastern side of the Grand Lake. Here, the farmland transitions into forests. The route meets at a T-intersection with SR 703. The SR 364 and SR 703 concurrency travels northwestward, and SR 364 splits and heads north, after slightly more than a mile. SR 364 crosses a railroad track, and ends at a diamond interchange at SR 29. The road continues as County Road 15 after this point.

History
Around 1932, a gravel road from SR 219 to SR 32 was built in Auglaize County, and was designated as SR 364 two years later. In 1936, the designation was extended southward along a gravel road from its terminus at SR 219. This changed the southern terminus to SR 705, east of Osgood in Darke County. SR 364's northern terminus, SR 32, was renumbered to SR 54 in 1938, and it was renumbered again to SR 29 one year later. The section of SR 364 from SR 219 to SR 29 was also paved at this time. All of the highway was paved by 1940. In 1973, SR 29 was realigned northward to a divided highway, and its old alignment became part of SR 703. SR 364 was also extended to SR 29 via a concurrency with SR 703.

Major intersections

References

364
Transportation in Darke County, Ohio
Transportation in Mercer County, Ohio
Transportation in Auglaize County, Ohio